The Project Z (also called the "Z Bombers Project") was a military project of the Empire of Japan, similar to the Nazi German Amerikabomber project, to design an intercontinental bomber capable of reaching North America.

The planned aircraft
The Project Z aircraft was to have six  engines; the Nakajima Aircraft Company quickly began developing engines, proposing twinned Nakajima Ha-44 engines (the most powerful aircraft engine available in Japan at the time).

Designs were presented to the Imperial Japanese Army, including the Nakajima G10N, Kawasaki Ki-91, and Nakajima G5N. None, save for the G5N, developed beyond prototypes or wind tunnel models. Late in the war, Project Z and other heavy bomber projects were cancelled.

See also
American Theater (World War II)

References

External links
J-Aircraft.org

World War II Japanese heavy bombers
American Theater of World War II
Abandoned military aircraft projects of Japan